Sinomonas flava is a strictly aerobic and non-motile  bacterium from the genus Sinomonas which has been isolated from forest soil from the Anhui Province in China.

References

External links
Type strain of Sinomonas flava at BacDive -  the Bacterial Diversity Metadatabase

Bacteria described in 2009
Micrococcaceae